Piermont is an unincorporated community in Red River Parish, Louisiana, United States.

References

Unincorporated communities in Louisiana
Unincorporated communities in Red River Parish, Louisiana
Unincorporated communities in the Ark-La-Tex